Hermoza is a Spanish surname. Notable people with the surname include:

Éder Hermoza (born 1990), Peruvian footballer
Edivaldo Hermoza (born 1985), Bolivian footballer

Spanish-language surnames